The Montreal–Senneterre train (formerly called the Abitibi) is a passenger train operated by Via Rail between Montreal and Senneterre, in the Abitibi-Témiscamingue region of Quebec, Canada.

The journey from end to end takes approximately 13.5 hours. Many small hunting and fishing clubs operate along the route and appear as request stops in the timetable. It is also possible to make a reservation to get off at an unmarked spot.

The train travels three times a week. Between Montreal and Hervey-Jonction, it travels on the same line as the Montreal–Jonquière train, another regional route.

Route
The main stops of the Montreal–Senneterre train are:
Montreal (Central Station)
Joliette (Station)
Shawinigan (Station) 
Hervey-Jonction (Station; connection to Montreal–Jonquière train)
La Tuque (Station)
Parent (Station)
Clova (Station)
Senneterre (Station)

References

External links
   Via Rail Canada – Montreal–Senneterre train

Via Rail routes
Passenger rail transport in Quebec
Quebec railways
Canada railway-related lists